Alyona Zvantsova (Алёна Званцова, real name: Елена Владимировна Константинова (Elena Vladimirovna Konstantinova), born September 11, 1971, in Tomsk) is a Russian film director and screenwriter. She directed and/or wrote over two dozen feature films. She won, among other awards, a public award at Pacific Meridian festival in 2015.

Filmography

Screenplays
Young Wolfhound (TV, 2006–2007)
The Thaw (TV, 2013)
I’m Staying (2017)

References

1971 births
Russian film directors
Living people
Place of birth missing (living people)